Pietro Ferrero may refer to:

* Pietro Ferrero (1898–1949), Italian businessman
 Pietro Ferrero Jr. (1963–2011), Italian businessman
 Pietro Ferrero (anarchist) (1892–1922), Italian anarchist
 Pietro Ferrero (footballer) (1905–?), Italian football player